The William W. Johnson House in Franklin, Tennessee, along with the James Scales House, another Williamson County house, are notable as late 19th century central passage plan residences that "display period decoration at eaves and porch." It has been described as I-house architecture.

The  property, including two contributing buildings and two contributing structures, was listed on the National Register of Historic Places in 1988.

Dates of historic significance for the property include c.1820, c.1840, and c.1875.

References

Houses completed in 1820
Houses completed in 1840
Houses completed in 1875
Houses on the National Register of Historic Places in Tennessee
Houses in Franklin, Tennessee
Central-passage houses in Tennessee
I-houses in Tennessee
National Register of Historic Places in Williamson County, Tennessee